or the  is a group of islands in the Norwegian Sea corresponding roughly to the municipality of Vega.  Since 2004, it has been a UNESCO World Heritage Site. This cluster of around 6,500 small islands in Nordland county, just south of the Arctic circle, surrounds the main island of Vega and has been inhabited since the Stone Age.  Other islands in the group include Igerøya, Ylvingen, and Søla.

Description

The islands bear testimony to a distinctive frugal way of life based on fishing and the harvesting of the down of eider ducks, in an inhospitable environment. There are fishing villages, quays, eider houses (built for eider ducks to nest), farmland, and lighthouses.  There is evidence of human settlement from the Stone Age onwards. By the 9th century, the islands had become an important centre for the supply of down, which appears to have accounted for around a third of the islanders' income.

The Vega archipelago reflects the way generations of fishermen/farmers have, over the past 1500 years, maintained a sustainable living in an inhospitable seascape near the Arctic Circle, based on the now unique practice of eider down harvesting, and it also celebrate the contribution made by women to the eider down process.

Access to the archipelago is by ferry or fast boat from the town of Brønnøysund in the municipality of Brønnøy, which can be reached by plane or by road.

Important Bird Area
The archipelago was identified as an Important Bird Area (IBA) by BirdLife International because it supports populations of greylag and barnacle geese, common eiders, common loons, great cormorants, European shags, white-tailed eagles, purple sandpipers and black guillemots.

References

External links
 Brief description of Vegaøyan by UNESCO
 Official Web site

Tourist attractions in Nordland
Vega, Norway
Archipelagoes of Norway
World Heritage Sites in Norway
Important Bird Areas of Norway
Landforms of Nordland